"Tell Em" is a song by American rappers Cochise and Snot, released on May 28, 2021, with an accompanying music video directed by Cole Bennett. Written by the artists alongside producer Jootsu, the song is about the rappers' success and money-making. After snippets of the song appeared on TikTok, it became popular and highly-anticipated.

Charts

Certifications

References

2021 singles
2021 songs
Snot (rapper) songs
Columbia Records singles
Music videos directed by Cole Bennett

Number-one singles in New Zealand